Runnin' Off At Da Mouth is the debut album by emcee Twista, who was known at the time as Tung Twista. Released on June 9, 1992, it was Loud Records’ first release and its only release distributed by Zoo. This album was released after Twista entered the Guinness Book of World Records as the world's fastest emcee.

"Mr. Tung Twista" was the sole single released from the album, though it failed to chart.

Track listing

References

Twista albums
Loud Records albums
Zoo Entertainment (record label) albums
1992 debut albums